This is a list of current soccer clubs in Canada.

Men's soccer clubs

Tier 1

Major League Soccer

Canadian Premier League

Tier 3

League1 British Columbia

League1 Ontario

Première ligue de soccer du Québec

MLS Next Pro

Below Tier 3 (leagues)

United Premier Soccer League 
 FC Berlin (home games in United States)
 Chantilly Forever FC (home games in United States)

USL League Two 

Renamed from Premier Development League (PDL) after the 2018 season.

 FC Manitoba
 Thunder Bay Chill

College and University Soccer

U Sports (Canada)

NCAA Division II 

 Simon Fraser University – member of the Great Northwest Athletic Conference

Canadian Soccer League (not affiliated to the CSA)

Women's clubs

Tier 2

United Women's Soccer 

 Calgary Foothills WFC
 SASA Impact FC
 FC Berlin (home games in United States)

Tier 3

League1 Ontario

Première Ligue de soccer du Québec

League1 British Columbia

Below Tier 3

U Sports

NCAA Division II 

 Simon Fraser Clan – member of the Great Northwest Athletic Conference

See also 

 Canada national soccer team (disambiguation)

References 

 
Canada
clubs
Soccer